Shelkovskaya (lit. place where is wind or Шелковски; Moxne, Şelkovski) is a rural locality (a stanitsa) and the administrative center of Shelkovskoy District of the Chechen Republic, Russia. Population: 

It was founded on the place where a small Chechen village previously stood. Half of the former residents of that village moved up north along the Terek River, where they started a new village (it is where now the town of Kizlyar in the Republic of Dagestan stands). Both villages were later destroyed by the Mongols.

References

Rural localities in Shelkovskoy District